Viktor Nikolyuk (born in Oct. 24, 1975, Kirovohrad Oblast) - is a Major General who serves as commander of Operational Command North

Information 

He was born on 19 October 1975 in Kirovohrad region. In 1996 he graduated Kharkiv Guards High Command Armoured Warfare school, and in 2007, the National Defense University of Ukraine. He later commanded the 92nd Mechanised Brigade.

In August 2014 the brigade's units were involved in an attempt to relieve encircled forces near Ilovaisk. The column stopped in the field for a night and shortly after it was hit by heavy artillery shelling.

On May 16, 2015, near of Shchastia in Luhansk region (sector "A"), soldiers of the 92nd brigade led by Nikolyuk captured soldiers of 3rd special brigade Special Assignment GRU of the Russian Federation Alexander Aleksandrov and Yevgeny Yerofeyev. (See  for details.) During the battle, a Ukrainian soldier, a younger Sergeant Vadim Pugachev, died. The detainees were citizens of Russia, servicemen of the armed forces of the Russian Federation. On March 29, 2015, the President of Ukraine, Petro Poroshenko decorated the participants in the detention of Russian special forces received military . Colonel Viktor Nikoluk was awarded Order of Bohdan Khmelnytsky of III degree.

On November 3, 2015, Russian-separatisr forces opened fire at the base of the 92nd UBRD in the area of the settlement Trokhizbenka, and Colonel Viktor Nikolyuk was wounded.

On 2016 Viktor Nikolyuk filed a lawsuit with the Supreme Prosecutor's Office in order to compensate for the non-pecuniary damage which, in his opinion, was caused to him by the military prosecutor's office of the ATO forces in the person of one of the investigators and to recognize the illegal decision of the investigator to conduct a search in the military unit В6250.

See also 
 Mikhaylo Zabrodsky

Sources 
 https://ukrstream.tv/en/videos/commander_of_the_92nd_brigade_there_are_very_few_militias_left_russian_militaries_fight_there

References

1975 births
People from Kirovohrad Oblast
Ukrainian colonels
Living people
Ukrainian military personnel of the war in Donbas
Recipients of the Order of Danylo Halytsky
Recipients of the Order of Bohdan Khmelnytsky, 3rd class